The Sex Discrimination Commissioner is an Australian federal government position established to oversee the operation of the Sex Discrimination Act 1984. The position was created alongside the Act as one of the specialist commissioners of the Human Rights and Equal Opportunity Commission. The commissioner also has an educative role, frequently called upon to comment upon gender issues in the workforce.

The role was created with the Act in 1984, with the Hawke government appointing Pam O'Neil, a Labor MLA from the Northern Territory, as the first commissioner. She was replaced in 1988 by Quentin Bryce, who became Australia's first female Governor-General in 2008. The fate of the position appeared unclear in the late 1990s, as Susan Halliday, the then-Commissioner, repeatedly came into conflict with the Howard Liberal government, despite being a Liberal appointee. Halliday's angry resignation in 2001 led to speculation that the office may be disbanded; Pru Goward, a close personal friend of Howard, was instead appointed as her replacement. Goward resigned in late 2006 in order to run for the New South Wales Legislative Assembly, and was replaced in mid-2007 by lawyer Elizabeth Broderick, a former partner with Blake Dawson.

Reviews by Kate Jenkins

Respect@Work Report
In January 2020, Sex Discrimination Commissioner Kate Jenkins handed to the Morrison government her Respect@Work Report, described by the ABC as “a landmark national inquiry into sexual harassment in workplaces by the Australian Human Rights Commission”. On 8 April 2021, the Morrison government released its response to the report, which it has dubbed A Roadmap for Respect: Preventing and Addressing Sexual Harassment in Australian Workplaces, accepting (either wholly or in principle) or “noted” all 55 recommendations. Though the legislation is still to be prepared, it was indicated that the definition of “serious misconduct” in workplaces will include sexual harassment, which will also be a valid reason for dismissal. Judges and politicians will be subject to the same sexual harassment laws as the wider population. Under human rights laws, the time limit for complaints will be extended from six months to two years.

Review of Parliament House's workplace culture 
On 5 March 2021, Jenkins said she will lead a review of Parliament House's workplace culture following the 2021 Australian Parliament House sexual misconduct allegations. She is expected to hand down her interim report in July 2021.

List of Sex Discrimination Commissioners
 Pam O'Neil (1984–1988)
 Quentin Bryce (1988–1993)
 Sue Walpole (1993–1997)
 Susan Halliday (1998–2001)
 Pru Goward (2001–2006)
 Elizabeth Broderick (2007–2015)
 Kate Jenkins (2016–present)

See also
 Sex discrimination
 Australian Human Rights Commission
 Sex Discrimination Act 1984

References

External sources
Sex Discrimination Act 1984 on Austlii

Gender equality
Gender in Australia
Human rights in Australia
1984 establishments in Australia